Chadar may refer to:

An alternative spelling of Chador
the Zanskar River in Ladakh, when frozen in winter months
Chadar trek, the trail over the frozen Zanskar River
Chadar Road, a section of the Nimmu–Padum–Darcha road that runs next to the Zanskar River